Outerspace is a compilation album by underground hip hop group OuterSpace and was released on Babygrande Records in 2004, 3 months before the release of their debut "Blood and Ashes". The album consists of songs released on old twelve inches and EP's. The album also includes two new tracks which is the single for the album, "151" and "Divine Evil" featuring Chief Kamachi. "151" was also featured on "Midnight Club 3: DUB Edition", the song is heard at the end of each race.

Track listing

 "Delerium (ft. Rich Medina)" - 2:57
 "Conspiracy Theory" - 3:26
 "Third Rock" - 4:09
 "Fire in the Sky" - 3:05
 "We Lyve" - 4:13
 "Danger Zone (ft. Baby Blak)" - 3:49
 "Dysfunqtional" - 5:14
 "Qrown Royal (ft. King Syze & Faezone)" - 2:57
 "Front to Back (ft. King Syze & Destro)" - 3:52
 "Grand Groove II" - 3:33
 "151°" - 3:12
 "Divine Evil (ft. Chief Kamachi)" - 3:51

Samples

"Third Rock"
"Wild Hot" by Busta Rhymes & A Tribe Called Quest.

2004 albums
OuterSpace albums
Jedi Mind Tricks albums
Babygrande Records albums